Christos Velis (born 13 August 1974) is a retired Greek-born, Cypriot football midfielder.

References

1974 births
Living people
Greek people of Cypriot descent
Cypriot footballers
Diagoras F.C. players
GAS Ialysos 1948 F.C. players
Athinaikos F.C. players
PAOK FC players
Iraklis Thessaloniki F.C. players
Anorthosis Famagusta F.C. players
AEK Larnaca FC players
Rodos F.C. players
Association football midfielders
Super League Greece players
Cyprus international footballers
People from Rhodes
Sportspeople from the South Aegean